Farm Road may refer to:

Farm to Market Road, in United States
 A residential street running from Patterson Plank Road to the Hackensack River in Secaucus, New Jersey
 Farm Road (Hong Kong) (農圃道), a street in Ho Man Tin, Hong Kong